The Men's Marathon T46 had its Final held on September 17 at 7:30.

Medalists

Results

See also
 Marathon at the Paralympics

References
Final

Athletics at the 2008 Summer Paralympics
Summer Paralympics
Marathons at the Paralympics
Men's marathons